English Striptease (Spanish:Strip-tease a la inglesa) is a 1975 Spanish comedy film directed by José Luis Madrid and starring Carmen Sevilla, Teresa Gimpera and Ágata Lys.

Cast
 Teresa Gimpera 
 Ágata Lys 
 Juanito Navarro 
 Antonio Ozores 
 José Sazatornil 
 Carmen Sevilla

References

Bibliography
 Bentley, Bernard. A Companion to Spanish Cinema. Boydell & Brewer 2008.

External links 

1975 films
Spanish comedy films
1975 comedy films
1970s Spanish-language films
Films directed by José Luis Madrid
1970s Spanish films